"Book of the Stranger" is the fourth episode of the sixth season of HBO's fantasy television series Game of Thrones, and the 54th overall. The episode was written by series co-creators David Benioff and D. B. Weiss, and directed by Daniel Sackheim.

Sansa Stark arrives at the Wall and reunites with Jon Snow, and later receives a message from Ramsay Bolton challenging Jon to come take back Winterfell and rescue Rickon Stark; Margaery Tyrell is reunited with her brother, Loras; Cersei and Jaime Lannister plot with their uncle Kevan and Olenna Tyrell to have them released; and Daenerys Targaryen faces the khals.

"Book of the Stranger" received widespread acclaim from critics, who noted the reunion of Jon Snow and Sansa Stark, and Daenerys Targaryen taking charge of all the khalasars as high points of the episode, one calling them "huge, forward moving story elements that harkened back to season 1." Filming of the episode's closing scene was shot at two different locations. In the United States, the episode achieved a viewership of 7.82 million in its initial broadcast. The episode was Emilia Clarke's selection for the 68th Primetime Emmy Awards to support her nomination.

This episode marks the final appearance for Natalia Tena (Osha).

Plot

At the Wall
Jon, released from the Night's Watch by his death, states his desires to head south, as he is disillusioned by the betrayal of his fellow Night's Watchmen and tired of endless fighting. Sansa, Brienne, and Podrick arrive at Castle Black and Sansa is reunited with Jon. After telling each other their stories, Sansa tries to convince Jon to help her retake Winterfell. However, Jon is still reluctant to fight. Frustrated, Sansa declares to Jon that she will take back Winterfell whether he helps her or not.

Meanwhile, Brienne confronts Davos and Melisandre, and informs them that she killed Stannis to avenge Renly Baratheon. She warns Davos and Melisandre that even though that was in the past, she does not forget or forgive. Brienne also attracts the unrequited (though non-predatory) romantic attentions of Tormund. 

Some time later, a letter from Ramsay to Jon arrives. Ramsay boasts that he has Rickon in his custody and demands Sansa's return, threatening to have the Bolton army exterminate the wildlings, kill Rickon and gang-rape Sansa while forcing Jon to watch before they kill him. Jon agrees to help Sansa retake Winterfell. When Tormund warns him that the wildlings are outnumbered by Ramsay's army, Sansa points out that Jon can use his status as the son of Eddard Stark to unite the North against Ramsay.

In Winterfell
Osha is brought before Ramsay, who asks her why she was helping Rickon. Osha claims that she intended to betray Rickon and attempts to seduce Ramsay while reaching for a nearby knife. However, Ramsay tells her that he is aware Osha used a similar ruse to escape Theon, and stabs her in the neck, killing her.

In King's Landing
Margaery is brought to meet the High Sparrow, who warns her to stay away from her life of riches and sin, and recounts his past of how, as a proud cobbler, he learned his wealth-guided pursuits were lies and that the shoeless poor were closer to the truth than anyone. He then takes Margaery to see Loras, who is breaking under the Sparrows' torture and is willing to do anything to make it stop. Margaery realises that the High Sparrow is trying to use Loras to break her, and tells him to remain strong.

Cersei meets with Tommen, who brings up the High Sparrow. Tommen is reluctant to provoke him, but Cersei says he is dangerous because he has no respect for the Crown. Tommen tells Cersei that Margaery's walk of atonement will happen soon. Cersei relays the information to Kevan and Olenna. Olenna is horrified and pledges her army to defeat the Sparrows; Kevan is bound by Tommen not to attack the Sparrows but is swayed when Cersei points out that there is also no order to defend the Sparrows from Olenna's army and that he can have his son Lancel back once the Sparrows are defeated.

In The Vale
Littlefinger arrives at Runestone in the Vale. When Lord Yohn Royce asks how Sansa became married to Ramsay instead of travelling to the Fingers, Littlefinger claims Roose Bolton's men kidnapped her and implies that Royce informed him of their destination. He manipulates Robin Arryn into considering executing Royce, then into giving him a second chance after he pledges his absolute loyalty. Littlefinger then tells Robin that Sansa, his cousin, has escaped the Boltons and is taking refuge at Castle Black, but that she is still not safe. Robin agrees to command Royce to lead the Knights of the Vale to protect her.

On The Iron Islands
Theon returns to Pyke and reunites with Yara. Yara has not forgiven Theon for not coming with her after her costly assault on the Dreadfort and accuses Theon of returning to take advantage of Balon's death to seize the throne. Theon insists he only heard the news after landing and promises that he will instead support Yara's claim at the Kingsmoot.

In Meereen
Despite Grey Worm and Missandei's objections, Tyrion arranges a diplomatic meeting with representatives from Astapor, Yunkai and Volantis. He proposes a deal allowing the cities seven years to transition away from slavery, while compensating the masters for any losses. In return, the masters will cease their support of the Sons of the Harpy. As the representatives deliberate, Tyrion is confronted by the former slaves of Meereen, who oppose any kind of negotiation with the masters. Grey Worm and Missandei reluctantly support Tyrion, but in private they warn him that the masters, with whom they are both familiar, will use him if he tries to use them.

In Vaes Dothrak
Jorah and Daario arrive at Vaes Dothrak and hide their weapons, as they are forbidden in the city. In the process, Jorah accidentally reveals his greyscale infection to Daario. They encounter Daenerys outside the Temple of the Dosh Khaleen and try to convince her to sneak out of the city, but Daenerys knows that is impossible due to the 100,000 Dothraki present in the city. Instead, she tells them she has a different plan and that they are going to help her.

Later that night, Daenerys stands before the gathered khals in the temple to hear her fate. There, she recalls her pregnancy ritual in this temple and Khal Drogo's vow to conquer Westeros. She accuses the khals of being unsuited to leading the Dothraki due to their lack of ambition, and says she will lead them. When Khal Moro and the other khals threaten to gang-rape her, she tips two braziers onto the straw floor, quickly setting the entire temple on fire and killing the khals, who have been barred inside by Jorah and Daario. The Dothraki witness Daenerys emerge from the burning temple, naked but unburned; amazed, the Dothraki along with Jorah and Daario bow down to her and worship her.

Production

Writing

"Book of the Stranger" was written by the series' creators David Benioff and D. B. Weiss. Some material in this episode is taken from the Jon XIII chapter in A Dance With Dragons. Some elements in the episode are also based on the sixth novel in the A Song of Ice and Fire series, The Winds of Winter, which author George R. R. Martin had hoped to have completed before the sixth season began airing.

Filming

"Book of the Stranger" was directed by Daniel Sackheim. He joined the series as a director in the sixth season. He also directed the previous episode, "Oathbreaker". In an interview Sackheim commented on the Jon and Sansa reunion stating "Sometimes as a director, you're just looking at what's in front of you, and not taking into account the bigger picture and the epic nature of two siblings who have been separated for six seasons — and have never had scenes together, and were both really looking forward to it — reuniting. The only note I gave them during the scene was, "Hold yourself back. As much as it's joyous to see each other, you're equally as scared. You don't know what to expect." The operative word was fear. Fear of the unknown. In a way, it added to the emotional resonance of the scene."

For the final scene with Daenerys Targaryen emerging from the great fire of the Temple of the Dosh Khaleen, the filming took place in two different locations, with the close ups of Emilia Clarke taking place on a closed set in Belfast, and the large-scale set shots taking place in Spain. In an interview, Clarke had previously indicated she had become reluctant to do nude scenes unless it served the plot. After the episode aired, Clarke made a point to indicate that it was not a body double in the final scene of the episode, stating, "I'd like to remind people the last time I took my clothes off was season 3. That was awhile ago. It's now season 6. But this is all me, all proud, all strong. I'm just feeling genuinely happy I said 'Yes.' That ain't no body double!" She continued, "Taking off my clothes is not the easiest thing, but with the magic of the effects, I don't have to do a season 1 and go on a cliff and do it, I'm in control of it."

Series co-creator and executive producer Weiss praised Clarke's portrayal in the scene saying "Emilia absolutely crushed it. It's one of those weird scenes because it was half shot in Spain, half in Belfast. But largely due to her performance, it works brilliantly." Sackheim, the director of the episode, noted in an interview, "With the interior, there was only one way for her to play it, which is, bemused. She's the keeper of the secret. She knows how to extricate herself from this. I thought the ease with which she delivered the lines was necessary for the audience to feel jeopardy for her and for them to think she was crazy. The sequence outside was all about claiming the throne — or reclaiming the throne." Sackheim also stated, "We wanted to clearly distinguish everything we've seen from the end of the last season and the beginning of this one."

Reception

Ratings 
"Book of the Stranger" was viewed by 7.82 million American households on its initial viewing on HBO, which was slightly more than the previous week's rating of 7.28 million viewers for the episode "Oathbreaker". The episode also acquired a 3.9 rating in the 18–49 demographic, making it the highest rated show on cable television of the night. In the United Kingdom, the episode was viewed by 2.775 million viewers on Sky Atlantic; it also received 0.116 million timeshift viewers.

Critical reception
"Book of the Stranger" received universal praise from critics, with many citing the reunion of Jon Snow and Sansa Stark, the final scene involving Daenerys Targaryen killing the leaders of the khalasar, and the forward moving storytelling as strong points for the episode. On review aggregator website Rotten Tomatoes, the episode has an approval rating of 100% based on 63 reviews, with an average rating of 8.79/10. The website's critical consensus reads, ""Book of the Stranger"'s warm reunions, new alliances, and exquisitely fiery finale is Game of Thrones at its best." It is the highest-rated Game of Thrones episode on the website.

In a review for IGN, Matt Fowler wrote of the episode, ""Book of the Stranger" handed us two very lovely, satisfying moments with the Stark/Snow reunion at Castle Black (and the subsequent vow to defeat Ramsay and rescue Rickon) and Daenerys's conquering of Vaes Dothrak. Both were huge, forward-moving story elements that harkened back to Season 1 and gave viewers something to root for and grab onto as the show itself heads into its final arcs." Fowler also noted, "As a reader of the books with no more books to read, Season 6 has been a very interesting experience," giving the episode a 9.2 out of 10. Jeremy Egner of The New York Times also praised the scenes at Castle Black and in Vaes Dothrak, writing "Game of Thrones lived up to its billing as A Song of Ice and Fire on Sunday, as there was plenty of action in both of the signature halves of the story." Brandon Nowalk of The A.V. Club wrote, "Now that is how you set the table. "Book Of The Stranger" doesn't just check off plot points. In fact, there aren't a lot of plot points to check off. It's an episode of introductions, reunions, and wall-to-wall scheming," giving the episode an A. Eliana Dockterman of Time wrote about the strong female storylines in the episode, stating "The creators of Game of Thrones have been touting the sixth season of the show as the year when women finally wreak vengeance. The fourth episode, "Book of the Stranger," suggests that they will hold true to their word."

Accolades

Notes

References

External links

 "Book of the Stranger" at HBO.com
 

2016 American television episodes
Game of Thrones (season 6) episodes
Television episodes directed by Daniel Sackheim
Television episodes written by David Benioff and D. B. Weiss